Malinová may refer to:
 Malinová, Slovakia
 Malinová, Czech Republic